This list is incomplete.  You can help Wikipedia by expanding it.
The following is a list of dams and reservoirs in Maine, USA.

Major dams are linked below.

Major dams and reservoirs in Maine 

 Bonny Eagle Dam, unnamed reservoir on the Saco River, NextEra Energy
 Harris Station Dam, Indian Pond, NextEra Energy
 Howland Dam
 Kennebunk Dam, Mousam River
 Lake Auburn
 Long Falls Dam, Flagstaff Lake, NextEra Energy
 Milford Dam
 Milltown Dam, on the Saint Croix River, NB Power
 Orono Dam
 Ripogenus Dam, Hydroelectric Dam at the headwaters of the west branch of the Penobscot River, owned by Brookfield Asset Management
 Skelton Dam, unnamed reservoir on the Saco River, NextEra Energy
 Stillwater Dam
 West Enfield Dam
 Wyman Dam, Wyman Lake, NextEra Energy

Removed dams
Edwards Dam, on the Kennebec River, privately owned (removed 1999)
Great Works Dam (removed, 2012)
Veazie Dam (removed, 2013)

References 

 
 
Maine
Dams
Dams